Roger Bossert (born 4 October 1961) is a Swiss retired footballer who played in the 1980s as defender.

Bossert joined FC Basel's first team for their 1982–83 season und head-coach Rainer Ohlhauser. Bossert played his debut for the club in the away game in the Swiss Cup on 17 October 1982 as Basel won 4–0 against lower tier local club FC Breitenbach. He played his domestic league debut for the club in the away game on 21 November as Basel were defeated 3–4 by Luzern.

In his  one season with the club Bossert played a total of 12 games for Basel without scoring a goal. Five of these games were in the Nationalliga A, two in the Swiss Cup and five were friendly games.

Following his season with Basel, Bossert moved on to play for FC Laufen in the Nationalliga B, the second tier of Swiss football. He stayed with Laufen for two seasons and he played at least one season with FC Baden.

References

Sources
 Die ersten 125 Jahre. Publisher: Josef Zindel im Friedrich Reinhardt Verlag, Basel. 
 Verein "Basler Fussballarchiv" Homepage

FC Basel players
FC Laufen players
FC Baden players
Swiss men's footballers
Association football defenders
1961 births
Living people